The heat index (HI) is an index that combines air temperature and relative humidity, in shaded areas, to posit a human-perceived equivalent temperature, as how hot it would feel if the humidity were some other value in the shade. The result is also known as the "felt air temperature", "apparent temperature", "real feel" or "feels like". The humidity where the heat index feels like itself is typically left unstated. The heat index example in this case, 41°C, feels like 41°C only when the humidity is 21%. 

The human body normally cools itself by perspiration, or sweating. Heat is removed from the body by evaporation of that sweat. However, high relative humidity reduces the evaporation rate. This results in a lower rate of heat removal from the body, hence the sensation of being overheated. This effect is subjective, with different individuals perceiving heat differently for various reasons (such as differences in body shape, metabolic differences, differences in hydration, pregnancy, menopause, effects of drugs or drug withdrawal); its measurement has been based on subjective descriptions of how hot subjects feel for a given temperature and humidity. This results in a heat index that relates one combination of temperature and humidity to another.

Because the heat index is based on temperatures in the shade, while people often move across sunny areas, the heat index can give a much lower temperature than actual conditions of typical outdoor activities. Also, for people exercising or active, at the time, then the heat index could give a temperature lower than the felt conditions.

History 
The heat index was developed in 1979 by Robert G. Steadman. Like the wind chill index, the heat index contains assumptions about the human body mass and height, clothing, amount of physical activity, individual heat tolerance, sunlight and ultraviolet radiation exposure, and the wind speed. Significant deviations from these will result in heat index values which do not accurately reflect the perceived temperature.

In Canada, the similar humidex (a Canadian innovation introduced in 1965) is used in place of the heat index. Further, the heat index uses heat balance equations which account for many variables other than vapor pressure, which is used exclusively in the humidex calculation. A joint committee  formed by the United States and Canada to resolve differences has since been disbanded.

Definition

The heat index of a given combination of (dry-bulb) temperature and humidity is defined as the dry-bulb temperature which would feel the same if the water vapor pressure were 1.6 kPa.

A given value of relative humidity causes larger increases in the heat index at higher temperatures.

The relative humidity threshold, below which a heat index calculation will return a number equal to or lower than the air temperature (a lower heat index is generally considered invalid), varies with temperature and is not linear. The threshold is commonly set at an arbitrary 40%.

The heat index and its counterpart the humidex both take into account only two variables, shade temperature and atmospheric moisture (humidity), thus providing only a limited estimate of thermal comfort. Additional factors such as wind, sunshine and individual clothing choices also affect perceived temperature; these factors are parameterized as constants in the heat index formula. Wind, for example, is assumed to be . Wind passing over wet or sweaty skin causes evaporation and a wind chill effect that the heat index does not measure. There have been attempts to create a universal  apparent temperature, such as the wet-bulb globe temperature, "relative outdoor temperature", "feels like", or the proprietary "RealFeel".

Meteorological considerations
Outdoors in open conditions, as the relative humidity increases, first haze and ultimately a thicker cloud cover develops, reducing the amount of direct sunlight reaching the surface. Thus, there is an inverse relationship between maximum potential temperature and maximum potential relative humidity.

The human body requires evaporative cooling to prevent overheating. Wet-bulb temperature, and Wet Bulb Globe Temperature are used to determine the ability of a body to eliminate excess heat.  A sustained wet-bulb temperature of about   can be fatal to healthy people; at this temperature our bodies switch from shedding heat to the environment, to gaining heat from it.

Table of values 
The table below is from the U.S. National Oceanic and Atmospheric Administration.

Effects of the heat index (shade values)

Exposure to full sunshine can increase heat index values by up to 8 °C (14 °F).

Formula

There are many formulas devised to approximate the original tables by Steadman. Anderson et al. (2013), NWS (2011), Jonson and Long (2004), and Schoen (2005) have lesser residuals in this order. The former two are a set of polynomials, but the third one is by a single formula with exponential functions.

The formula below approximates the heat index in degrees Fahrenheit, to within ±. This equation reproduces the above NOAA National Weather Service table (except the values at  & 45%/70% relative humidity vary unrounded by less than ±1, respectively).

where
HI = heat index (in degrees Fahrenheit)
T = ambient dry-bulb temperature (in degrees Fahrenheit)
R = relative humidity (percentage value between 0 and 100)

The following coefficients can be used to determine the heat index when the temperature is given in degrees Celsius, where
HI = heat index (in degrees Celsius)
T = ambient dry-bulb temperature (in degrees Celsius)
R = relative humidity (percentage value between 0 and 100)

A further alternate is this:

where

For example, using this last formula, with temperature  and relative humidity (RH) of 85%, the result would be: .

Limitations
The heat index does not work well with extreme conditions, like supersaturation of air-- when the air is more than 100% saturated with water. David Romps, a physicist and climate scientist at the University of California, Berkeley and his graduate student Yi-Chuan Lu, found that the heat index was underestimating the severity of intense heat waves, such as 1995 Chicago heat wave. Other issues with the heat index include unavailability of precise humidity data in many geographical regions, assumption that the person is healthy and has easy access to water and shade.

See also 
 Apparent temperature
 
 Humidex
 Wet-bulb temperature
 Wind chill

References

External links 
Description of wind chill & apparent temperature Formulae in metric units
Heat Index Calculator Calculates both °F and °C
Current map of global heat index values

Atmospheric thermodynamics
Meteorological indices